Bennington Township is one of the 25 townships of Licking County, Ohio, United States. As of the 2010 census, the population was 1,687, up from 1,265 at the 2000 census.

Geography
Located on the northern edge of the county, it borders the following townships:
Milford Township, Knox County - north
Miller Township, Knox County - northeast corner
Burlington Township - east
McKean Township - southeast corner
Liberty Township - south
Monroe Township - southwest corner
Hartford Township - west
Hilliar Township, Knox County - northwest corner

No municipalities are located in Bennington Township.

Name and history
Statewide, the only other Bennington Township is located in Morrow County.

Government
The township is governed by a three-member board of trustees, who are elected in November of odd-numbered years to a four-year term beginning on the following January 1. Two are elected in the year after the presidential election and one is elected in the year before it. There is also an elected township fiscal officer, who serves a four-year term beginning on April 1 of the year after the election, which is held in November of the year before the presidential election. Vacancies in the fiscal officership or on the board of trustees are filled by the remaining trustees.

References

External links

Townships in Licking County, Ohio
Townships in Ohio